Olanza Harris (born 25 October 1976) is a Jamaican cricketer. He played in one List A match for the Jamaican cricket team in 2004/05.

See also
 List of Jamaican representative cricketers

References

External links
 

1976 births
Living people
Jamaican cricketers
Jamaica cricketers
People from Saint Ann Parish